La Encarnación  is a neighbourhood (barrio) of Asunción, the capital and largest city of Paraguay.

References 

Neighbourhoods of Asunción